Akhasheni is an appellation for wines produced around Akhasheni village, Gurjaani district, Kakheti region in eastern Georgia.

Akhasheni is a naturally semi-sweet red wine made from the Saperavi grape variety. It is of dark-pomegranate color and has a harmonious velvety taste with a chocolate flavor. It contains 10.5–12% alcohol, 3–5% sugar and has 5–7% titrated acidity. The wine has been manufactured since 1958.

See also 
Georgian wine
Sweetness of wine
List of Georgian wine appellations

References 

Georgian wine
Georgian products with protected designation of origin